Children's Film Society India (CFSI) was a nodal organisation of Government of India that produced children's films and various TV programs in various Indian languages. Established in 1955, CFSI functioned under the Ministry of Information and Broadcasting, Government of India and was headquartered in Mumbai.

In March 2022, it was merged with National Film Development Corporation.

History
The concept of an exclusive cinema for India's children was mooted by its first Prime Minister Jawaharlal Nehru, and Children's Film Society, India (CFSI) was founded on 11 May 1955 with Hriday Nath Kunzru as its first president. The first film produced by CFSI was Jaldeep (1956), an adventure film directed by Kidar Sharma also starring Mala Sinha.

The Chairperson of CFSI was selected for a duration of three years, and over the years, several notable personalities have remained Chairperson of CFSI including Sai Paranjpye (twice), Nafisa Ali (2005–2008), Nandita Das. (2008–2012), Amol Gupte (2012-2015) and Mukesh Khanna (2015-2018).

In March 2022, four government-run film and media units including Children's Film Society merged with National Film Development Corporation (NFDC).

Activities
CFSI produced feature films and short films for children in various languages of India. It organised subsidised shows and distributed film prints. In the last 52 years CFSI had made 114 feature films, 45 short animations, 9 puppet films, as well as 52 short documentaries and news magazines. CFSI also organised an International Children's Film Festival held every alternate year in India. The films produced by CFSI had participated in many film festivals all over the world and had won many awards.

Selected filmography

See also
 National Film Development Corporation of India (NFDC)

References

External links
 

Film organisations in India
Organisations based in Mumbai
Film production companies based in Mumbai
Ministry of Information and Broadcasting (India)
1955 establishments in Bombay State
Government agencies established in 1955
Producers who won the Best Children's Film National Film Award
Youth in India